め, in hiragana, or メ in katakana, is one of the Japanese kana, each of which represents one mora. Both versions of the kana are written in two strokes and represent .

Stroke order

Other communicative representations

 Full Braille representation

 Computer encodings

References

Specific kana